Parafilaria is a genus of nematodes belonging to the family Filariidae.

The species of this genus are found in Northern America.

Species:

Parafilaria antipinni 
Parafilaria bovicola 
Parafilaria multipapillosa

References

Nematodes